"Butterflies" is a song by Norwegian singer Tone Damli from her third studio album I Know (2009). It was released in Norway on 9 January 2009. The song peaked at number 2 on the Norwegian Singles Chart. The song was written by David Eriksen, Billy Burnette, Tone Damli Aaberge and Mats Lie Skåre.

Eurovision Song Contest 2009
She contended in the Norwegian Eurovision Song Contest 2009 finals, with the song and ended up in the runner-up position behind Alexander Rybak who went on to win the contest for Norway.

The song uses a sample from Walking On Broken Glass by Annie Lennox (1992).

Track listing

Chart performance

Release history

References

2009 singles
Tone Damli songs
Songs written by Billy Burnette
2008 songs
Universal Music Group singles